Crestwood may refer to:

Places

Australia
Crestwood, Queanbeyan, New South Wales
Crestwood, Sydney, New South Wales
Crestwood Estate, Thornlie, Western Australia

Canada
Crestwood (Edmonton), a neighborhood in the City of Edmonton, Alberta

United States
(by state)
Crestwood Hills, Los Angeles, California
Crestwood (Valdosta, Georgia), listed on the NRHP in Georgia
Crestwood, Illinois
Crestwood, Kentucky
Crestwood, Missouri
Crestwood Historic District, Kansas City, MO, listed on the NRHP in Missouri
Crestwood Village, New Jersey
Crestwood (Yonkers), a neighborhood of Yonkers, New York
Crestwood, Portland, Oregon, a neighborhood of Portland, Oregon
Crestwood/Glen Cove, Houston, a neighborhood of Houston, Texas
Crestwood (Washington, D.C.), a neighborhood of Washington, D.C.

Other uses
Crestwood Community School, in Eastleigh, Hampshire, England
Crestwood Preparatory College, a high school in Toronto, Ontario, Canada
Crestwood Publications, a comic book publisher from the 1940s through the 1960s
Epiphone Crestwood, a guitar manufactured from 1958 to 1970 by Epiphone